Lucerapex denticulata is a species of sea snail, a marine gastropod mollusk in the family Turridae, the turrids.

Description
The length of the shell varies between 13 mm and 19.2 mm.

Distribution
This species occurs in the Indian Ocean off Somaliland, East Africa and the Gulf of Aden at depths between 730 m and 1270 m.

References

 Thiele J. (1925). Gastropoden der Deutschen Tiefsee-Expedition. II Teil. Wissenschaftliche Ergebnisse der Deutschen Tiefsee-Expedition auf dem Dampfer "Valdivia" 1898–1899. 17(2): 35-382, pls 13-46

External links
 Biolib.cz: Lucerapex denticulata
 A.W.B. Powell, The family Turridae in the Indo-Pacific. Part 1. The subfamily Turrinae; Indo-Pacific mollusca. vol. 1 Pages: 227--346

denticulata
Gastropods described in 1925